Captain Shreve High School (CSHS) is a public high school in Shreveport, Louisiana, United States. Opened in the fall of 1967, the school was named for Captain Henry Miller Shreve, who was responsible for clearing the log jam on the Red River, which led to the founding of Shreveport in 1835. Captain Shreve has the second largest enrollment of high schools in the Caddo Parish Public Schools district with an enrollment of over 1,635 students (2018-19 school year).

History
 1968 May – 137 members of the first graduating class of Captain Shreve High School receive diplomas at Shreveport Civic Center
 1984 – recognized as one of only two Blue Ribbon Schools in Louisiana by President Ronald Reagan. This award recognizes schools whose students have thrived and excelled and highlights outstanding models of school leadership. 
 2017 May – the National Association of Student Councils recognizes Captain Shreve High School's student council as a Gold Council of Excellence for the 10th straight year.

Athletics
Captain Shreve High athletics competes in the LHSAA.

Championships

Football Championships
(1) State Championship: 1973 (Class 4A)

Baseball Championships
(1) State Championship: 2006 (Class 4A)

Boys' Basketball Championships
(1) State Runners-up: 1970 (Class 3A)
(1) District Championship: 2021

Girls' Basketball Championships
(1) District Championship: 2017

Boys' Golf Championships
(5) State Championship: 1970 (Class 3A), 1971 (Class 3A), 1982 (Class 4A), 1987 (Class 4A), 2003 (Class 5A)

Tennis Championships
 1970 – Gators tie with Byrd HS for State Tennis Championship (team)
 1971 – Gators win State Tennis Championship (team 2nd, girls singles, mixed doubles)
 1974 – Gators win State Tennis Championship (girls team, girls singles, girls doubles)
 1975 – Gators win State Tennis Championship (girls team 2nd, boys team, girls singles, boys singles, girls doubles, mixed doubles) 
 1976 – Gators win State Tennis Championship (girls team 3rd, girls singles, boys singles, mixed doubles) 
 1977 – Gators win State Tennis Championship (girls team 4th, girls singles, girls doubles) 
 1978 – Gators win State Tennis Championship (girls team 5th, girls singles, girls doubles, boys doubles, mixed doubles) 
 1979 – Gators win State Tennis Championship (girls team 6th, girls singles, girls doubles, mixed doubles)
 1980 – Gators win State Tennis Championship (girls team 7th, girls singles, girls doubles)
 1984 – Gators win State Tennis Championship (girls team 8th, boys team 2nd)
 1985 – Gators win State Tennis Championship (girls team 9th)
 1986 – Gators win State Tennis Championship (girls team 10th) 
 1990 – Gators win State Tennis Championship (boys team 3rd)
 1991 – Gators win State Tennis Championship (boys team 4th)
 1993 – Gators win State Tennis Championship (boys team 5th)
 2002 – Gators win State Tennis Championship (boys team 6th)

Coaches
Lee Hedges, eighteen seasons at Captain Shreve as head football coach and Hedges' teams had a 146–52–4 (.733) record, with eight district championships.

Notable alumni

 Ken Anderson, NFL defensive lineman for the Chicago Bears in 1998 and 1999
 Scott Baker, MLB pitcher
 LaMark Carter, Olympic athlete in the triple jump (2000, Sydney)
 Charlie Cook, founder of The Cook Political Report
 Adam Hamilton, music producer, songwriter, and session drummer and guitarist; member of L.A. Guns
 Roland Harper, NFL running back for the Chicago Bears
 Bo Harris, NFL linebacker for the Cincinnati Bengals
 Keith Hightower, businessman and Democratic mayor of Shreveport from 1998 to 2006
 Mike Johnson, congressman
 Kay McDaniel, tennis player; member of the Southern Tennis Hall of Fame
 Robert Moore, NFL defensive back for the Atlanta Falcons
 Carlos Pennywell, NFL wide receiver for the played with the New England Patriots
Adrian Perkins, mayor of Shreveport since 2018
Tammy Phelps, member of the Louisiana House of Representatives
 Alan Seabaugh, attorney and member of the Louisiana House of Representatives
 Sean West, MLB pitcher for the Miami Marlins

References

External links

High schools in Shreveport, Louisiana
Public high schools in Louisiana
1967 establishments in Louisiana